WESTconsin Credit Union is a not-for-profit financial cooperative that was founded as Menomonie Farmer's Credit Union in 1939. WESTconsin is headquartered in Menomonie, Wisconsin. Currently, they have over 100,000 members and control more than $1.1 billion in assets, with offices in the Wisconsin communities of Altoona, Amery, Baldwin, Barron, Chippewa Falls, Eau Claire, Ellsworth, Hudson, Menomonie, New Richmond, Prescott, River Falls, and Spring Valley. WESTconsin Credit Union has also gained notice for their high school offices, located in Amery, Baldwin-Woodville, Menomonie, and New Richmond.

History
On December 5, 1938, Chris Hovland, William Millar, Jr., J.C. Martinson, Stewart L. Gevne, Edward Torgerson, Harold E. Martinson, and Gene Long signed Articles of Incorporation, applying for a charter for the Menomonie Farmers Credit Union. On January 12, 1939, the Articles of Incorporation of this credit union were approved and filed with the State Banking Department in Madison, Wisconsin. In 1949, the credit union hired Art Gilberts as its first full-time manager. He managed the credit union from his house until 1953. By 1953, the credit union had grown to $365,000 in assets and the Board of Directors decided the credit union should have its own office. Office space was rented one-half block off Main Street in downtown Menomonie.
  
With Menomonie Farmers Credit Union’s (MFCU) continued growth and success, other credit unions in the area turned to MFCU to merge for greater strength and to save credit union service in their communities. MFCU merged with smaller credit unions in the area over the next few years. River Falls merged in December 1974; Barron and Amery merged in January 1979; Baldwin merged in August 1979; and New Richmond merged in September 1984. Also, a satellite office was opened on the UW-River Falls campus in September 1994.

By December 1980, the credit union had assets of $29.9 million. In January 1981, long-time President Art Gilberts retired. Robert J. Wilson, who began his career with the credit union in 1954, succeeded Gilberts as President.
  
The 1990s were ushered in with another major change for MFCU when members voted to change the name to WESTconsin Credit Union.  This change was made to recognize the diversity of the membership and the various communities served throughout western Wisconsin. Another change in management occurred in 1993 when Robert J. Wilson retired as president. Greg Lentz was appointed by the Board of Directors to succeed Wilson as president.

The new century brought changes and expansion to WESTconsin. In 2001, the Menomonie–East office was constructed. An office in Hudson was opened in 2004, and offices in Spring Valley and Prescott came in 2007. WESTconsin Realty, a full-service realty company was created in the spring of 2004, and WESTconsin Title Services in the spring of 2012, to service western Wisconsin. WESTconsin opened an office in Eau Claire in 2012, in Ellsworth in 2014, in Chippewa Falls in 2015, and in Altoona in 2017 bringing the current office count to 15. Lora Benrud, who began working at WESTconsin Credit Union in 1984, became the fourth president in August 2014. In 2018, membership hits over 100,000 people, and as WESTconsin Credit Union continued to grow it was determined they needed more space and they expanded with a new Administrative Center in 2019.

Due to the COVID-19 pandemic, WESTconsin saw many changes to their operations in 2020, including lobbies that were open by appointment only and employees working remotely for the first time. Throughout the year, WESTconsin was able to make multiple large contributions to area organizations, including $45,000 to food banks and $30,000 to domestic abuse shelters.

Membership
Membership is open to anyone who lives or works in the Wisconsin counties of Barron, Buffalo, Burnett, Chippewa, Clark, Dunn, Eau Claire, Jackson, Pepin, Pierce, Polk, Rusk, St. Croix, Sawyer, Taylor, Trempealeau, and Washburn, or the Minnesota counties of Anoka, Chisago, Dakota, Goodhue, Isanti, Pine, Ramsey, Wabasha, and Washington with a $5 deposit in a membership share (savings) account.

High school offices
Presently, WESTconsin Credit Union has four fully operational high school offices that are located in Amery, Baldwin-Woodville, Menomonie, and New Richmond.

Kindness Counts
WESTconsin Credit Union is committed to helping their members achieve financial success, with sincere care for employees, members, and communities. This care and the philosophy of people helping people, guides the credit union leaders and encourages their employees to get involved in community and charitable activities and worthwhile causes. During WESTconsin’s celebration of its 75th Anniversary, the Kindness Counts Initiative was born and has continued to be a focus for the credit union. WESTconsin proudly donates over $165,000 and gives over $5,000 in in-kind donations each year to local events and organizations throughout their membership area including:

 Schools
 Youth Sports
 Humane societies
 Clubs and organizations
 Other community events

WESTconsin supports and provides many financial education resources to local schools and the general public. In-class simulations and classroom presentations are available to local schools, and $12,000 in scholarships are awarded each year. Employees of WESTconsin volunteer over 4,500 hours and raise over $17,000 yearly for local organizations through Jeans Days fundraisers. Together we're not just strong, we're community strong!

References

External links

Credit unions based in Wisconsin
Banks established in 1939
Dunn County, Wisconsin